Micropterix trinacriella is a species of moth belonging to the family Micropterigidae that was described by Michael A. Kurz, Hans Christof Zeller-Lukashort and Marion E. Kurz in 1997. It is only known from the area near the northern shore of Sicily, as well as in the surrounding of Mount Etna.

References

External links

Images of Micropterix trinacriella

Micropterigidae
Moths described in 1997
Endemic fauna of Italy
Moths of Europe